Laud Quartey (born 11 March 1984 in Ghana) is a Ghanaian football player who last played for Tajik League side Vakhsh Qurghonteppa.

Career
Quartey began his career 2001 with Accra Hearts of Oak SC and was on 2 December 2009 linked with a movement to Young Africans.

In December 2012 Quartey left Hearts of Oak. In April 2014, whilst on trial in Asia, Quartey was linked with a move back to Hearts of Oak due to their on-going injury crisis.

References

1984 births
Living people
Ghanaian footballers
Sekondi Wise Fighters players
Association football goalkeepers
Tajikistan Higher League players